Sin City is a series of graphic novels by Frank Miller.

Sin City, Sin Cities, or City of Sin may also refer to:

Places
Sin City (description), a nickname for a city that caters to various vices
Las Vegas, which is sometimes referred to as "Sin City"
 Lynn, Massachusetts, described in an old rhyme as, "Lynn, Lynn, the city of sin, you'll never go out, the way you went in"

Arts, entertainment, and media

Films
 City of Sin (film), the 1963 rerelease of The Scavengers (1959)
 Sin City (film), a 2005 film based on Miller's graphic novels
 Sin City: A Dame to Kill For, a 2014 sequel to the 2005 film

Literature
 City of Sin: London and Its vices, a book by Catharine Arnold
 Sin City (2002), a Harold Robbins novel
Sin City, an autobiographical book by the British journalist Ralph Shaw

Music

Albums
City of Sin (album), 2020 album by the  Dutty Moonshine Big Band
Sin City (Genitorturers album), an album by the band the Genitorturers
Sin City (soundtrack), soundtrack for the film Sin City
Sin City (The Flying Burrito Brothers album), an album by the band The Flying Burrito Brothers
Sin City The Mixtape, a mixtape by the rapper Ski Mask the Slump God
City of Sin, an album by the band This Picture released in 1994

Songs
 "City of Sin" (song), a 2010 song on American rock band Escape the Fate's third album, Escape the Fate
"Sin City", a song by the band AC/DC, from their album, Powerage
"Sin City", a song by Chris de Burgh, from his first album, Far Beyond These Castle Walls
"Sin City" is also a song by the Orange County, CA band, Dead End Road, from their album "The Good Days". The track was featured in Tony Hawk's Underground 2 video game.
"Sin City", a 1969 song by Gram Parsons and Chris Hillman, of The Flying Burrito Brothers, recorded on their first album, The Gilded Palace of Sin
"Sin City", a song by American deathcore band Upon A Burning Body from the album Red. White. Green.

Television
 Sin Cities: A Life Less Ordinary, a TV series on Showcase Network that visits the world's most exotic environment for sex-related content
 "Sin City" (Supernatural), an episode of the television series Supernatural

Brands and enterprises
 Sin City (studio), an adult film production company

See also
SimCity